Pseudopharus nigra is a moth of the family Erebidae. It is found in Panama.

References

Moths described in 1904
Phaegopterina